Phosphorus bromide may refer to:
Phosphorus tribromide, PBr3
Phosphorus pentabromide, PBr5
Phosphorus heptabromide, PBr7

See also
Phosphorus halides